The 2009–10 season was the 106th year of Beşiktaş' existence, as well as its 50th season in the Süper Lig. The club also competed in the Turkish Cup and UEFA Champions League. Beşiktaş entered the season as the defending champion of both the Süper Lig and the Turkish Cup. During the pre-season, the club also participated in the Peace Cup, finishing second in their group behind Porto and ahead of Lyon.

The first transfer of the January window was goalkeeper Ramazan Özcan.

Team kit
 
The new season kits of Beşiktaş were introduced on 19 July on the season jersey and fall/winter fashion clothing show at Nevzat Demir Facilities. The kit supplier of jerseys is Adidas and the main jersey sponsor is Cola Turka for the season, as it is since 2004.

Players

First team squad

According to official club website as of 31 July 2009:

Transfers

In

Out

Statistics

Süper Lig

Standings

Results by round

Team record

Top scorers

Friendly matches

Peace Cup

Beşiktaş participated in the 2009 "Peace Cup". Beşiktaş was placed in group D, along with Porto (Portugal) and Lyon (France). Beşiktaş finished 2nd place missing the knockout round by 2 points.

Turkish Super Cup

Beşiktaş played the 2008–09 Turkish Cup finalist Fenerbahçe for the Turkish Super Cup. Beşiktaş previously defeated Fenerbahçe 4–2 in the Turkish Cup final.

Turkish Super League

As the defending Super League champions, Beşiktaş started the 2009–10 Turkish Super League season with a 1–1 draw with İstanbul B.B.

First Half

Second half

1Ankaraspor was regulated to the Bank Asya 1. Lig. 3–0 default win.
2Due to heavy snowfall this match was postponed to 10 March 2010.

Final standings

Turkish Cup

Beşiktaş J.K. participated in the Turkish Super Cup as the defending champions. By finishing the Turkish Super League in 1st place last year, Beşiktaş automatically qualified to the group stages. After losing their first 3 games Beşiktaş was eliminated from the cup.

Group stage

UEFA Champions League

Beşiktaş qualified for the UEFA Champions League by becoming the champion of the Turkish Super League last year. Beşiktaş was seeded in group D along with Manchester United (England), CSKA Moscow (Russia) and Wolfsburg (Germany).

Group stage

References

Beşiktaş J.K. seasons
Beşiktaş